John "Ian" Scanlon (13 July 1952) is a Scottish former professional footballer. During his playing career Scanlon represented East Stirlingshire, Aberdeen, St Mirren and English club Notts County.

Career
Scanlon moved from East Stirlingshire to Notts County for a fee of £10,000. In November 1974 he scored a hat-trick against Sheffield Wednesday, taking 165 seconds from the first to the third goal, a club record. In 1977, after being dropped for a game against Carlisle United, Scanlon walked out on Notts County. After openly considering retirement from football, and making false claims to have inherited money, he joined Aberdeen. Scanlon won the Scottish Football League Premier Division with Aberdeen in 1979–80, before being sold to St Mirren in part exchange for Peter Weir. He played 140 games for the Saints, scoring 40 goals, including competing in the UEFA Cup in 1983–84 and 1985–86 before retiring in May 1986.

Honours
With Aberdeen:
Scottish Football League Premier Division 
 Winner - 1979–80
Scottish Cup
Runner-up - 1978
Scottish League Cup
Runner-up - 1979–80

References

External links

Living people
1958 births
Aberdeen F.C. players
St Mirren F.C. players
East Stirlingshire F.C. players
Notts County F.C. players
Scottish footballers
Scottish Football League players
English Football League players
Association football wingers